Chandler James Jones (born February 27, 1990) is an American football defensive end for the Las Vegas Raiders of the National Football League (NFL). He played college football at Syracuse, and was selected by the New England Patriots in the first round of the 2012 NFL Draft. He has also played for the Arizona Cardinals.

Jones is the younger brother of UFC Heavyweight Champion Jon Jones and former NFL player Arthur Jones.

Early years
Jones was born in Rochester, New York, to parents Arthur Jr. and Camille Jones. Jones attended Union-Endicott High School, where he played high school football. He was a 2007 SuperPrep All-Northeast and PrepStar All-East Region selection. Jones was ranked as the eighth-best prospect of the state of New York by Scout.com.

College career
Jones attended and played college football at Syracuse from 2008-2011. After not playing as a freshman in 2008, he appeared in 12 games as a sophomore. He totaled 52 combined tackles and 1.5 sacks. As a junior in 2010, he recorded 57 total tackles, four sacks, four passes defensed, and three forced fumbles. As a senior in 2011, Jones played in only seven games due to injury, but still was an All-Big East selection after recording 39 tackles and 4.5 sacks.

On December 30, 2011, Jones announced that he would enter the 2012 NFL Draft.

Collegiate statistics

Professional career

Jones was considered one of the best defensive end prospects for the 2012 NFL Draft.

New England Patriots
Jones was drafted by the New England Patriots in the first round with the 21st overall selection. He was the highest selected player from Syracuse since defensive end Dwight Freeney in 2002. On May 23, 2012, Jones signed a four-year contract with the Patriots.

2012 season
As a rookie, Jones was immediately thrust into the starting right defensive end slot for the Patriots in 2012. In Week 1 against the Tennessee Titans, Jones strip-sacked quarterback Jake Locker, with fellow rookie teammate Dont'a Hightower recovering the ball and returning it for a touchdown. A week later Jones sacked Arizona Cardinals quarterback Kevin Kolb, forcing a fumble that was recovered by the Patriots.

In Week 6 against the Seattle Seahawks, Jones recorded two sacks on quarterback Russell Wilson and managed to provide some good pressure on the Seahawks offensive line, forcing one fumble in that game. Jones made his sixth career sack in Week 8 against the St. Louis Rams by dropping Sam Bradford to the turf in London, England. In 14 games (13 starts) of his rookie season in 2012, Jones produced 45 tackles, six sacks, five passes defended, and three forced fumbles. He was named to the PFWA All-Rookie Team.

2013 season
In a game against the Baltimore Ravens, quarterback Tyrod Taylor fumbled the snap and Jones recovered it in the end zone for the first touchdown of his career. Jones started all 16 games in 2013 recording 42 tackles with 11.5 sacks, 1 forced fumble, and a fumble recovery returned for a touchdown.

2014 season
For the season, Jones recorded 43 tackles and six sacks in 10 games. In Week 2, against the Minnesota Vikings, Jones recorded two sacks; he also blocked a field goal and returned it for a touchdown in the 30–7 victory.. He earned AFC Defensive Player of the Week for his game against Minnesota. On February 1, 2015, he won his first Super Bowl ring when the Patriots defeated the Seattle Seahawks by a score of 28-24 in Super Bowl XLIX. He had one sack and three tackles in the victory.

2015 season
On April 30, 2015, the Patriots picked up the option on Jones' contract. Through the first eight games, Jones racked up 9.5 sacks, including two in an October 29 win over the Miami Dolphins on Thursday Night Football to help the Patriots move to 7-0. Jones finished the regular season with a team-leading 12.5 sacks, a new career high, as well as his first career interception. He was ranked 48th by his fellow players on the NFL Top 100 Players of 2016.

Six days before the Patriots took on the Kansas City Chiefs in the AFC Divisional Round, Jones was hospitalized after showing up at the Foxborough Public Safety Building in a disoriented but cooperative state. Later reports indicated that he had experienced a bad reaction to synthetic marijuana, a legal drug under Massachusetts law. Jones still played in the following Divisional Round playoff game against the Kansas City Chiefs and the AFC Championship against the Denver Broncos.

Arizona Cardinals
On March 15, 2016, Jones was traded to the Arizona Cardinals in exchange for Jonathan Cooper and a second-round pick in the 2016 NFL Draft.

2016 season
In 2016, Jones started all 16 games for the Cardinals, recording 49 tackles, 11 sacks, three passes defensed and four forced fumbles. He was also ranked 85th on the NFL Top 100 Players of 2017.

2017 season

On February 27, 2017, the Cardinals placed the non-exclusive franchise tag on Jones. On March 10, 2017, he signed a five-year, $82.5 million contract extension with the Cardinals. On December 19, 2017, he was named to his second Pro Bowl and earned first team All-Pro honors. Jones finished the season leading the league with 17.0 sacks, which set a new Cardinals' franchise record. He finished third in Defensive Player of the Year voting. He was ranked 28th by his fellow players on the NFL Top 100 Players of 2018.

2018 season
In 2018, Jones was moved to defensive end as new Cardinals head coach Steve Wilks implemented a 4–3 defense. In Week 5, Jones recorded a sack, pass breakup, three tackles for loss, a forced fumble and recovery in a 28–18 win over the San Francisco 49ers, earning him NFC Defensive Player of the Week. He finished the season with 49 tackles, 13 sacks, four passes defensed, and three forced fumbles. His 13 sacks led the team and were tied for seventh in the league.

2019 season
During Week 3 against the Carolina Panthers, Jones sacked Kyle Allen twice in the 38-20 loss. During a Week 7 27–21 road victory over the New York Giants, he sacked rookie Daniel Jones four times, one of which resulted in a forced fumble which he recovered. Jones was named the NFC Defensive Player of the Week for his performance. During Week 16 against the Seattle Seahawks, Jones sacked Russell Wilson four times and forced a fumble on David Moore which was recovered by teammate Jordan Hicks during the 27–13 road victory. He earned a second NFC Defensive Player of the Week nomination for his game against Seattle.

Jones finished the season with 53 tackles and set career-highs in sacks with 19, forced fumbles with eight, fumble recoveries with three, pass deflections with five. He was named to his third Pro Bowl and earned first team All-Pro honors. He was also the runner-up for Defensive Player of the Year. He was ranked 15th by his fellow players on the NFL Top 100 Players of 2020. He was named to the Pro Football Hall of Fame's All-2010s team.

2020 season
In Week 1 against the San Francisco 49ers, Jones recorded his first and only sack of the season on Jimmy Garoppolo during the 24–20 win. In Week 5, he suffered a torn bicep and was placed on injured reserve on October 15, 2020.

2021 season
In Week 1 against the Tennessee Titans, Jones finished with five sacks as the Cardinals won 38–13. His performance tied the franchise single game sack record, and he was named NFC Defensive Player of the Week. In Week 11, Jones had four tackles, two sacks, and a forced fumble in a 23–13 win over the Seattle Seahawks, earning NFC Defensive Player of the Week. He finished the season second on the team with 10.5 sacks, 41 tackles, four passes defensed, and a team-leading six forced fumbles. He was named to the Pro Bowl. He was ranked 62nd by his fellow players on the NFL Top 100 Players of 2022.

Las Vegas Raiders
On March 17, 2022, Jones signed a three-year, $51 million contract with the Las Vegas Raiders.

In Week 13, Jones had three sacks, six tackles, two tackles for loss, and a pass breakup in a 27–20 win over the Chargers, earning AFC Defensive Player of the Week. Against his former team, the New England Patriots in Week 15, Jones made a notable play at the end of regulation. As the Patriots were attempting a lateral play to try to win the game with the score tied at 24, Jones intercepted a lateral from Jakobi Meyers intended for Mac Jones before stiff-arming the New England quarterback and running the ball in for the game-winning touchdown. The following week against the Pittsburgh Steelers, Jones suffered an elbow injury after colliding with teammate Maxx Crosby while attempting to sack Kenny Pickett and was carted off the field. He was later placed on injured reserve, ending his season. He finished the 2022 season with 4.5 sacks, 38 combined tackles, three passes defended, and one forced fumble to go along with the fumble return for a touchdown.

NFL career statistics

Regular season

Postseason

Personal life
Jones is the youngest of his brothers. His oldest brother, Arthur, is a former defensive end in the NFL, while his other brother Jon is an American mixed martial artist and current heavyweight champion and former light heavyweight champion of the world currently competing for the UFC. Jones graduated from Syracuse in 2012.

References

External links

 Las Vegas Raiders bio
 Syracuse Orange bio

1990 births
Living people
100 Sacks Club
21st-century African-American sportspeople
African-American players of American football
American football defensive ends
American football outside linebackers
Arizona Cardinals players
Las Vegas Raiders players
National Conference Pro Bowl players
New England Patriots players
People from Endicott, New York
Players of American football from New York (state)
Sportspeople from Rochester, New York
Syracuse Orange football players
Unconferenced Pro Bowl players